"Wake Up" is a song by American rock band Rage Against the Machine. It is the seventh track from their self-titled debut album. While never released as a single, it remains a staple of their live shows and is usually played as the last song before the encore; the spoken word portion of the song, using a real memo from J. Edgar Hoover, is often replaced with a speech addressing contemporary issues, given by frontman Zack de la Rocha. It appears in the 1999 film The Matrix to punctuate the final scene, which has increased its exposure and cultural cachet.

Composition

The lyrics discuss racism within the American government and the counter-intelligence programs of the Federal Bureau of Investigation (FBI); a spoken portion of the song is taken from an actual FBI memo in which its director J. Edgar Hoover suggests targets for the suppression of the black nationalist movement. The song also makes references to prominent African-American figures targeted by the government such as Malcolm X and Martin Luther King Jr., and goes as far as saying that the government arranged their assassinations.

The closing lines to the song are:

These lyrics refer to a speech made by Martin Luther King Jr., which paraphrases part of a well-known Bible verse, "whatever a man sows, this he will also reap" (Galatians 6:7). The speech was delivered at the end of the Selma to Montgomery March on the steps of the State Capitol Building in Montgomery, Alabama. The final lines in that speech read "How Long? Not long, because 'you shall reap what you sow'."

"Wake Up" is one of many songs by Rage Against the Machine that is played in drop D tuning on the guitar and bass.

Political speeches
In live performances, the band's frontman Zack de la Rocha often makes speeches about current issues in place of the segment where he reads the J. Edgar Hoover memo aloud. At the 2007 Coachella Festival, de la Rocha used this segment of the song to allege that the United States would start wars in other countries to suit its own purposes, citing a statement by Noam Chomsky regarding the Nuremberg Trials:

 
The event led to a media furor.  A clip of his speech found its way to the Fox News Channel program Hannity & Colmes. An on-screen headline read, "Rock group 'Rage Against the Machine' says Bush admin should be shot." Ann Coulter (a guest on the show) quipped, "They're losers, their fans are losers, and there's a lot of violence coming from the left wing." Then Alan Colmes reminded Coulter when she said about former President Bill Clinton that "The only issue is whether to impeach or assassinate."

In response, during the band's performance at the Rock the Bells festival in New York City on July 28, de la Rocha doubled down on his remarks at Coachella, claiming the show had deliberately misrepresented his words:

On other occasions, de la Rocha has used this segment of the song to denounce the United States' handling of Hurricane Katrina, condemn globalism, urge solidarity among the lower classes against the wealthy elite, and express support for protesters in response to the Great Recession.

In other media
The song was used in the end credits of the 1999 feature film The Matrix and was also featured on its soundtrack. It is one of many songs in the soundtrack which fades-out rather than stops.
An orchestral cover of the song by musician Sebastian Bohm was featured in the trailer for the fourth installment of the franchise, The Matrix Resurrections. Another cover, performed by Brass Against, is featured over the film's end credits, mirroring its use in the original film.
The song is included on the soundtrack to the 2001 BMX video game Dave Mirra Freestyle BMX 2.
The song appears in the debut episode of the ABC television series Dirty Sexy Money, first broadcast in 2007.
The song is used as the entrance song for New York Yankees closer Aroldis Chapman.

References

1992 songs
Rage Against the Machine songs
Songs against racism and xenophobia
Song recordings produced by Garth Richardson
Songs written by Tom Morello
Songs written by Brad Wilk
Songs written by Tim Commerford
Songs written by Zack de la Rocha